Emily Temple-Wood (born May 24, 1994) is an American Wikipedia editor who goes by the name of Keilana on the site. She is known for her efforts to counter the effects and causes of gender bias on Wikipedia, particularly through the creation of articles about women in science. She was declared a joint recipient of the 2016 Wikipedian of the Year award, by Jimmy Wales, at Wikimania on June 24, 2016. As of 2021 she is a physician in Chicago.

Early life 
Temple-Wood attended Avery Coonley School in Downers Grove, Illinois. A 2017 Wired article described her as "the type of middle schooler who refused to stand for the Pledge of Allegiance, because she thought the idea of making children swear a loyalty oath was bizarre." She won the 2008 DuPage County Spelling Bee. This victory led to her participating in the Scripps National Spelling Bee the same year, where she lasted until the quarterfinals and finished in 46th place. Following the competition, in June 2008 she was honored by the then-lieutenant governor of Illinois, Pat Quinn, along with the other regional spelling bee champions. She went on to attend Downers Grove North High School, where she was a member of the speech team. This team won four medals, one of which was for first place, at the 2011 Illinois High School Association state meet in Peoria. As a senior, she was named to the "top two percent" in 2012. In May 2016, she graduated from Loyola University Chicago with degrees in molecular biology and Arabic and Islamic studies. She began medical school at Chicago's Midwestern University in the fall of 2016.
Since 2020, she is a medical school graduate and a practicing physician.

Work on Wikipedia 

Temple-Wood received national press coverage for creating Wikipedia articles about women scientists, as well as her activism to increase their representation on Wikipedia. She made her first edit to Wikipedia in 2005, at the age of 10. She first started contributing to the site when she was 12, and it was when she was 12 that she was first harassed online as a result of her Wikipedia contributions. She began her efforts in regards to women scientists when she was in middle school. In 2007, she became an administrator on Wikipedia and served on the Arbitration Committee from 2016 to 2017. She co-founded Wikipedia's WikiProject Women Scientists in 2012; since then, she has written hundreds of Wikipedia pages about female scientists. Editing under the username "Keilana", she began creating such articles when she noticed that few women who were members of the Royal Society had Wikipedia articles. She told the Wikimedia Foundation that when she first noticed this, she "got pissed and wrote an article that night. I literally sat in the hallway in the dorm until 2 a.m. writing [my] first women in science article."  The article she is the most proud of is that on Rosalyn Scott, the first African-American woman to become a thoracic surgeon.

Temple-Wood has also organized edit-a-thons at museums and libraries with the aim of increasing the representation of women scientists on Wikipedia. In October 2015, she told The Atlantic that she had identified 4,400 women scientists who did not have Wikipedia articles written about them even though each of them was notable enough to be covered by one. In March 2016, she gained international media attention because of her approach to the online sexual harassment she had received: for every such email she received, she plans to create a Wikipedia article about a woman scientist. That month, she told BuzzFeed News that with respect to her doing this, "My motivation is to channel the frustration I feel from being harassed into something productive." In May 2016, she told The Fader: "As a Wikipedian, my natural response to seeing a gap in coverage is to start a project, so that's what I did with the Women Scientists project. The narrative of history has been dominated by men, and making sure that women's biographies are included in Wikipedia can be our way of writing women back into that narrative."

Her work led to her being named as joint Wikipedian of the Year in 2016, along with Rosie Stephenson-Goodknight.

Positions 
Temple-Wood is a member of the board of directors of Wikimedia DC, the District of Columbia-area chapter of the Wikimedia movement. She is also a board member of the Wiki Project Med Foundation,  and has served as Wikipedian in Residence at the National Institute for Occupational Safety and Health.

The Keilana effect 

A paper, "Interpolating Quality Dynamics in Wikipedia and Demonstrating the Keilana Effect", about a phenomenon named after Temple-Wood's work, was presented by Aaron Halfaker at OpenSym '17, the International Symposium on Open Collaboration. This study finds an inflection point in term of articles' quality for women scientists around late 2012, when Temple-Wood, aka User:Keilana, impulsed a community effort on that matter.

Works 
 
 
 
  Reprinted in The Best American Science and Nature Writing 2017. Jahren, Hope, editor. Boston. . OCLC 1004672002.

See also 
 List of Loyola University Chicago people
 List of Wikipedia people

References

External links 

 
 

1994 births
21st-century American non-fiction writers
21st-century American women writers
American biographers
American science writers
American women biographers
Living people
Loyola University Chicago alumni
Place of birth missing (living people)
Wikimedians of the Year
Women science writers
Writers from Illinois
American Wikimedians
Wikipedia people
American osteopathic physicians